Donji Vakuf is a town and municipality located in Central Bosnia Canton of the Federation of Bosnia and Herzegovina, an entity of Bosnia and Herzegovina.

It was founded by Malkoçoğlu İbrahim Bey in 1572 and was known as "Aşağı Vakıf" ("lower foundation" in Turkish). Donji Vakuf is the Bosnian translation of "Aşağı Vakıf".

Settlements

 Babin Potok
 Babino Selo
 Barice
 Blagaj
 Brda
 Brdo
 Brezičani
 Ćehajići
 Ćemalovići
 Daljan
 Dobro Brdo
 Doganovci
 Dolovi
 Donji Rasavci
 Donji Vakuf
 Đulovići
 Fakići
 Fonjge
 Galešići
 Grabantići
 Gredina
 Grič
 Guvna
 Hemići
 Jablan
 Jemanlići
 Karići
 Keže
 Komar
 Korenići
 Košćani
 Kovačevići
 Krivače
 Kutanja
 Ljuša
 Makitani
 Novo Selo
 Oborci
 Orahovljani
 Petkovići
 Piljužići
 Pobrđani
 Ponjavići
 Potkraj
 Pribraća
 Prisika
 Prusac
 Rasavci
 Rastičevo
 Rudina
 Ruska Pilana
 Sandžak
 Semin
 Silajdževina
 Slatina
 Sokolina
 Staro Selo
 Suhodol
 Sultanovići
 Suljići
 Šahmani
 Rahmani
 Šeherdžik
 Šutkovići
 Torlakovac
 Urija
 Vlađevići
 Vrljaj

History
From 1929 to 1941, Donji Vakuf was part of the Vrbas Banovina of the Kingdom of Yugoslavia. From April 1993 to 14th of September 1995 the town's name was Srbobran.

Demographics

Population

Ethnic composition

Tourism
The village of Prusac lies just outside Donji Vakuf. Bosniaks make a pilgrimage to the nearby holy site of Ajvatovica in June. It is one of the biggest events in Bosnia.

Twin towns — sister cities
Donji Vakuf is twinned with:

 Gömeç, Turkey, since 2002

References

External links

 Official website

Cities and towns in the Federation of Bosnia and Herzegovina
 
Populated places in Donji Vakuf